Rånekampen ("The hog ridge") is a mountain in Nathorst Land at Spitsbergen, Svalbard. It has a height of 1,185 m.a.s.l. The mountain is located south of Van Mijenfjorden, and is surrounded by the mountains of Vengefjellet, Lundgrenfjellet and Steindolptoppen, and the glaciers of Langlibreen, Steindolpbreen, Vengebreen, and Rånebreen. The valley of Langlidalen separates Rånekampen from the mountains of Langlifjellet and Sven Nilssonfjellet.

References

Mountains of Spitsbergen